The 1970 Australian Rally Championship was a series of five rallying events held across Australia. It was the third season in the history of the competition.

Bob Watson and navigator Jim McCauliffe in the Renault R8 Gordini were the winners of the 1970 Championship.

Season review
The third Australian Rally Championship was decided over five events, with two in Victoria and one each in Queensland, New South Wales and South Australia.  The series was dominated by the Renault R8 Gordinis, with Watson and McCauliffe winning four of the five rounds and coming second in the other.  Their closest challenge was from Colin Bond and Brian Hope in the new Holden Monaro GTS 350.

The Rallies

The five events of the 1970 season were as follows.

Round One – Eureka Rally

Round Three – Cibie Snowy Rally

Round Five – Warana Rally

1970 Drivers and Navigators Championships
Final pointscore for 1970 is as follows.

Bob Watson – Champion Driver 1970

Jim McAuliffe – Champion Navigator 1970

References

External links
  Results of Snowy Mountains Rally and ARC results.

Rally Championship
Rally competitions in Australia
1970 in rallying